Via Nomentana is an ancient road of Italy, leading North-East from Rome to Nomentum (modern Mentana), a distance of . It was subsequently extended to Nomentum, but never became an important high road, and merged in the Via Salaria a few kilometers beyond Nomentum. It is followed as far as Nomentum by the modern state road, but some traces of its pavement still exist.

Originally starting from now-destroyed Porta Collina in the Servian Walls, in the third century emperor Aurelian build the Porta Nomentana in his new set of walls. Pope Pius IV decided to move the first stretch of the road and built the Porta Pia for this purpose.

Roman bridges 

There are the remains of at least one Roman bridge along the road, which is the Ponte Nomentano.

See also 
Roman road
Roman bridge
Roman engineering

References

Nomentana, Via
Roads in Italy
Rome Q. IV Salario
Rome Q. V Nomentano
Rome Q. XVI Monte Sacro
Rome Q. XVII Trieste
Rome Q. XXVIII Monte Sacro Alto
Rome Q. XXIX Ponte Mammolo
Rome Q. XXX San Basilio